Barleith railway station was a railway station near Hurlford, East Ayrshire, Scotland. The station was built by the Glasgow and South Western Railway on their Darvel Branch line.

History
The station was opened some time before 1904. It was renamed Barleith Halt in 1944, but was renamed back to Barleith in January 1954. The station closed permanently to passengers on 6 April 1964.

References

Notes

Sources
 
 

Disused railway stations in East Ayrshire
Railway stations in Great Britain opened in 1904
Railway stations in Great Britain closed in 1964
Beeching closures in Scotland
Former Glasgow and South Western Railway stations
1904 establishments in Scotland
1964 disestablishments in Scotland